Elizabeth Adekunle (born 1977) is a British Anglican priest and former Archdeacon of Hackney, London.

Born in 1977 in North London, United Kingdom, Adekunle read theology at Birmingham University, graduating as Bachelor of Theology (BTh), before pursuing further studies in divinity at London and Cambridge universities: MA in African Christianity (SOAS) and in Pastoral care and counselling (Cantab), while training at Ridley Hall, Cambridge for ordination.

Ordained in the Church of England, from 2007 to 2011, Adekunle was curate and then priest-in-charge at St Luke's Church, Hackney. During this time she also served as a chaplain to Homerton Hospital and St Mellitus College. Adekunle was appointed chaplain of St John's College, Cambridge in 2011, serving till 2016.

On 1 July 2015, Adekunle was appointed as Archdeacon of Hackney in the Diocese of London following Bishop Rachel Treweek; She was collated as archdeacon on 5 April 2016, when she became joint patron of the living of St John's Hoxton (with the Haberdashers' Company). She resigned effective 13 August 2021.

See also 

 Diocese of London

References

1977 births
Living people
Alumni of the University of Birmingham
English people of Nigerian descent
21st-century English Anglican priests
Alumni of SOAS University of London
Alumni of Ridley Hall, Cambridge
Archdeacons of Hackney
Staff of St Mellitus College